The Blue Swords  began as a senior international figure skating competition in East Germany. First time in 1984 the competition was organised only for junior skaters. The 1985 edition was held November 21–23 in  East-Berlin. Medals were awarded in the disciplines of men's singles, ladies' singles and pair skating.

Men

Ladies

Pairs

References
German Newspaper "Neues Deutschland" Archiv, 25.11.1985 / German Figure Skating Magazin "Pioruette"

Blue Swords
1985 in figure skating